This is a list of golf players who graduated from the Web.com Tour Finals in 2014. The top 25 players on the Web.com Tour's regular season money list in 2014 earned their PGA Tour card for 2015. The Finals determined the other 25 players to earn their PGA Tour cards and their priority order.

To determine the initial 2015 PGA Tour priority rank, the top 25 Web.com Tour's regular season players were alternated with the top 25 Web.com Tour Finals players. This priority order was then reshuffled several times during the 2015 season.

Under the new format, Adam Hadwin (Finals and regular season combined earnings) and Derek Fathauer (Finals earnings) were fully exempt for the 2014–15 season and received invitations to The Players Championship. Carlos Ortiz was also fully exempt on the PGA Tour after a three-win season.

2014 Web.com Tour Finals

*: PGA Tour rookie in 2015
†: First-time PGA Tour member in 2015, but ineligible for rookie status due to having played eight or more Tour events in a previous season
 Earned spot in Finals through PGA Tour.
 Earned spot in Finals through FedEx Cup points earned as a PGA Tour non-member.
 Indicates whether the player earned his card through the regular season or through the Finals.

Results on 2014–15 PGA Tour

*: PGA Tour rookie in 2015
†: First-time PGA Tour member in 2015, but ineligible for rookie status due to having played eight or more Tour events in a previous season
 Retained his PGA Tour card for 2016: won or finished in the top 125 of the money list or FedEx Cup points list.
 Retained PGA Tour conditional status and qualified for the Web.com Tour Finals: finished between 126–150 on FedEx Cup list and qualified for Web.com Tour Finals.
 Failed to retain his PGA Tour card for 2016 but qualified for the Web.com Tour Finals: finished between 150–200 on FedEx Cup list.
 Failed to retain his PGA Tour card for 2016 and to qualify for the Web.com Tour Finals: finished outside the top 200 on FedEx Cup list.

Tom Hoge, Sam Saunders, Mark Hubbard, Derek Fathauer, and Tyrone van Aswegen regained their PGA Tour cards through the 2015 Web.com Tour Finals. Bud Cauley suffered a torn labrum in September 2014, and could not play in 2015. He retained his PGA Tour card in 2016 through a medical extension.

Winners on the PGA Tour in 2015

Runners-up on the PGA Tour in 2015

References

External links
Web.com Tour official site

Korn Ferry Tour
PGA Tour
Web.com Tour Finals graduates
Web.com Tour Finals graduates